Sutton is a village (with 486 dwelling houses and a population of 1226) the village population increasing to 1,163 at the 2011 Census, in the English county of Norfolk.  It lies next to the Norfolk Broads (Barton Broad to its south-west, and Hickling Broad to its south-east), about 16 miles north-east of Norwich on the A149 road, adjacent to the slightly larger market town of Stalham.

Sutton has a public house and hotel, infant school, garden centre, village hall and a parish church.  Nearby is the striking landmark of  Sutton Mill, a Grade II* listed building. Tourism and recreational facilities include Sutton Pottery, and the Museum of the Broads.

References

External links

 UK Villages: Sutton
 Photographs of Sutton

North Norfolk
Villages in Norfolk
Civil parishes in Norfolk